Geybels is a surname. Notable people with the surname include:

Félix Geybels (1935–2013), Belgian footballer
Kim Geybels (born 1981), Belgian politician

Surnames of Belgian origin